Andy Greenberg is a technology journalist serving as a senior writer at Wired magazine. He previously worked as a staff writer at Forbes magazine and as a contributor for Forbes.com. He has published the books This Machine Kills Secrets concerning whistleblowing as well as Sandworm, concerning the eponymous hacking group.

Writing

Greenberg's July 2015 article about Charlie Miller and Chris Valasek's Jeep hack resulted in the recall of 1.4 million vehicles by Chrysler. On the day of the article's publication, a Bill was introduced in the U.S. Senate seeking standards to protect cars against digital hacks.

Greenberg's 2012 book This Machine Kills Secrets was a New York Times Editors' Choice. He is featured in the 2015 documentary film Deep Web, about the trial of Ross Ulbricht.

In 2014, Greenberg was nominated along with Ryan Mac for a Gerald Loeb Award for their Forbes Magazine article, "Big Brother's Brain". The same year, he was named as one of the SANS Institute's Top Cybersecurity Journalist Award Winners. In 2013, his Forbes.com story "Meet The Hackers Who Sell Spies The Tools To Crack Your PC (And Get Paid Six-Figure Fees)" won "The Single Best Blog Post of the Year" award from the Security Bloggers Network.

He received the 2019 Gerald Loeb Award for International Reporting for the article "The Code that Crashed the World: The Untold Story of NotPetya, the Most Devastating Cyberattack in History".

In his 2019 book Sandworm he describes how digital detectives unraveled the "Olympic Destroyer" malware and traced it so far that they could attribute it to Russia's military intelligence agency, the GRU.

Publications
This Machine Kills Secrets: Julian Assange, the cypherpunks, and their fight to empower whistleblowers. London: Penguin Group, 2012. .
Sandworm: a new era of cyberwar and the hunt for the Kremlin's most dangerous hackers. New York City: Knopf Doubleday, 2019. .
Tracers in the Dark: The Global Hunt for the Crime Lords of Cryptocurrency. Doubleday, 2022. .

See also
Computer worm

References

American technology journalists
Year of birth missing (living people)
Living people
People from Brooklyn
Gerald Loeb Award winners International